Sant'Agapito is a comune (municipality) in the Province of Isernia in the Italian region Molise, located about  west of Campobasso and about  south of Isernia. 
 
Sant'Agapito borders the following municipalities: Isernia, Longano, Macchia d'Isernia and Monteroduni.

References

External links

Cities and towns in Molise